My Husband's Woman (lit. "My Man's Woman") is a 2007 South Korean television series starring Kim Hee-ae, Bae Jong-ok, and Kim Sang-joong. It aired on SBS from April 2 to June 19, 2007 on Mondays and Tuesdays at 21:55 for 24 episodes.

Written by renowned TV scribe Kim Soo-hyun in her no-nonsense yet provocative style, the TV series explores the intimate and painful ordeal of women on both sides of the story behind an extramarital affair, delving into the minds of the betrayed and the betrayer.

It was the second highest-rated Korean drama of 2007 (next to Jumong), and won Kim Hee-ae the Grand Prize ("Daesang") at the 2007 SBS Drama Awards.

Plot
Ji-soo (Bae Jong-ok) is an unassuming housewife leading a happy life with her college professor husband Joon-pyo (Kim Sang-joong) and their son. But trouble lurks when Ji-soo's widowed friend Hwa-young (Kim Hee-ae) accompanies Ji-soo and her family on a trip and secretly begins a love affair with Joon-pyo. One day, Ji-soo hosts a barbecue party at her house and invites Hwa-young and her sister Eun-soo (Ha Yoo-mi). Besieged by passion, Hwa-young and Joon-pyo end up making out inside the kitchen, but soon get caught red-handed by Eun-soo. Shocked and sickened to her stomach, yet nervous about what her fragile sister might do if she ever finds out, Eun-soo threatens Hwa-young and Joon-pyo to end the affair immediately. But truth has a way of slipping out, and Ji-soo's perfect life comes crashing down when she learns that her husband is having an affair with her friend. In the aftermath of the revelation, the psychological warfare begins, and to retaliate, Ji-soo decides to have an affair herself with her old college friend Seok Joon (Lee Jong-won).

Cast

Main characters
Kim Hee-ae as Lee Hwa-young
Bae Jong-ok as Kim Ji-soo
Kim Sang-joong as Hong Joon-pyo
Lee Jong-won as Park Seok-joon

Supporting characters
Ha Yoo-mi as Kim Eun-soo, Ji-soo's sister
Kim Byung-se as Heo Dal-sam, Eun-soo's husband
Song Yi-woo as Heo Jin-joo, Eun-soo's daughter 
Jang Ki-bum as Heo Joon-goo, Eun-soo's son 
Song Jae-ho as Kim Yong-deok, Ji-soo's father
Nam Seung-min as Kim Kyung-soo, Ji-soo's brother
Oh Se-jung as Boo Yong-hwa, Kyung-soo's wife
Seo Woo-rim as Ms. Hwang, Joon-pyo's mother
Choi Jung-hoon as Chairman Hong, Joon-pyo's father
Park Ji-bin as Hong Kyung-min, Ji-soo's and Joon-pyo's son
Kim Young-ae as Hwa-young's mother
Lee Hoon as Lee Dong-ha, Hwa-young's brother
Song Sun-hee
Kwon Yong-chul
Joo Min-soo

Episode ratings

Awards and nominations

Plagiarism allegations
Writer Kim Soo-hyun strongly denied the accusations of plagiarism by Ryu Gyeung-ok, who claimed that My Husband's Woman was very similar to her own TV drama That Woman, Ok-hui.

References

External links
 My Husband's Woman official SBS website 
 

Seoul Broadcasting System television dramas
2007 South Korean television series debuts
2007 South Korean television series endings
Korean-language television shows
Television shows involved in plagiarism controversies
Television shows written by Kim Soo-hyun (writer)
South Korean romance television series
Television series by Samhwa Networks